Gait Abnormality Rating Scale (GARS) is a videotape-based analysis of 16 facets of human gait.  It has been evaluated as a screening tool to identify patients at risk for injury from falls. and has been used in remote gait evaluation.  A modified version was published in 1996.

Scoring and assessment 
The scale comprises three categories:
 five general facets
 four lower extremity facets
 seven trunk, head and upper extremity facets
Each item has a score range from 0 (good
function) to 3 (poor function).

The total GARS score is the sum of the 16 individual facets, and the total score represents a rank ordering of risk for falling, based on the number of gait abnormalities recognized and the severity of any gait abnormality identified.

References

Walking
Medical scales